Lady Elizabeth Edem Ironbar (died 26 October 2021) was a Nigerian politician from Cross River State. She was a member of the PDP and represented Akpabuyo on the Cross River State House of Assembly from 2015 until her death.

References 

20th-century births
2021 deaths
Peoples Democratic Party (Nigeria) politicians
21st-century Nigerian women politicians
People from Cross River State
21st-century Nigerian politicians
Members of the Cross River State House of Assembly
Women members of state legislatures in Nigeria